Luka Zdenjak (born 20 January 1987) is a Croatian male badminton player. In 2010, he became the runner-up at the Morocco International tournament in mixed doubles event partnered with Rajae Rochdy. In 2011 he won the mixed doubles event and the runner-up in the men's singles event at the Ethiopia International tournament.

Achievements

BWF International Challenge/Series
Men's Singles

Mixed Doubles

 BWF International Challenge tournament
 BWF International Series tournament
 BWF Future Series tournament

References

External links 
 

1987 births
Living people
Sportspeople from Zagreb
Croatian male badminton players